Renny Harlin (born 15 March 1959) is a Finnish film director, producer, and screenwriter who has made his career in Hollywood Europe and China. Harlins films have also a huge influence and recognition in India. His best-known films include A Nightmare on Elm Street 4: The Dream Master, The Adventures of Ford Fairlane, Die Hard 2, Cliffhanger, The Long Kiss Goodnight, and Deep Blue Sea.

Harlin's films have grossed over $520 million in the United States and over $1.2 billion in the worldwide aggregate box office, making him the 151st highest-grossing director in the global film market , and the most internationally successful Finnish filmmaker in terms of revenue. His 1993 film Cliffhanger is in the Guinness Book of World Records for the costliest aerial stunt ever performed. His 1995 film Cutthroat Island held the Guinness World Record for the former category "Largest box office loss".

Early life, family and education

Harlin was born Renny Lauri Mauritz Harjola in Riihimäki, Finland. His father was Oiva Harjola (formerly Harlin), a chief physician at Riihimäki Hospital, and his mother was Liisa Koskiluoma, a nurse. Since 1987, Renny's surname has been Harlin, his father's original surname. Renny has a half-brother, Veli-Pekka Harjola, who competed at the 1984 Summer Olympics in sprint canoeing.

Career

Early years
After studying at the University of Art and Design Helsinki, Harlin started his career in the film business in the beginning of the 1980s, directing commercials and company films for companies like Shell. Later, he worked as a buyer for a Finnish film distributor and met fellow Finn Markus Selin in Los Angeles in 1982. They became friends and started writing a screenplay called "Arctic Heat", which later evolved into Born American, with Mike Norris in the leading role. They secured financing from the U.S., and in 1986, Born American became the most expensive Finnish film ever. It opened in the U.S. in over 1,000 theaters. By July 9, 1986, he set up his own production company with partner Markus Selin, Larmark Productions, with the first two projects went low-budget, and it was a Los Angeles-based production company.

Harlin moved to Los Angeles and got a job from Irwin Yablans, who offered him a script of Prison to film. The film was made with a low budget and distributed with only 42 copies. In the same year, 1988, he got a job from New Line Cinema to direct A Nightmare on Elm Street 4: The Dream Master (1988) after meeting producer Robert Shaye, who at first did not want Harlin to direct the film. It became the highest-grossing film in the series until the 2003 release of Freddy vs. Jason, and its budget was seven times greater than the original A Nightmare on Elm Street.

Breakthrough and the 1990s 
After the success of A Nightmare on Elm Street 4: The Dream Master, Harlin was set to direct the science-fiction thriller Alien 3. He was attached to the project for a little over a year, but he left due to creative differences with the producers.

The comedy The Adventures of Ford Fairlane and the action thriller Die Hard 2 were edited simultaneously and released a week apart in 1990. The former flopped, but the latter was a commercial success. Harlin achieved critical acclaim the following year when he produced Rambling Rose through his own Midnight Sun Pictures for director Martha Coolidge. The film won Best Feature at the 1992 Independent Spirit Awards and earned its star and Harlin's then-partner Laura Dern a Best Actress Oscar nomination at the 1992 Academy Awards.

Harlin, Markus Selin and a number of other businessmen founded the indoor amusement park Planet FunFun in Kerava, Finland, in 1992, which included everything from a tropical park to a cinema park, the latter of which Harlin also gave his own special stamp to by loaning his film sets and props to special theme rooms. The park also hosted sports competitions and filmed television series. However Planet FunFun was short-lived, closing in 1995.

1993's action thriller Cliffhanger was Harlin's first film with Sylvester Stallone. Harlin's career suffered a blow with the pirate adventure film Cutthroat Island in 1995, which starred Harlin's then-wife, Geena Davis. Cutthroat Island was one of the biggest box-office bombs of all time, losing $147 million and leading to the bankruptcy of Carolco Pictures. Harlin did go on to have moderate success with Long Kiss Goodnight, starring Samuel L. Jackson and Davis in 1996, and the science fiction horror film Deep Blue Sea in 1999.

2000s 
Harlin wanted to direct a movie based on Formula One, but unable to secure the rights, he instead produced the film Driven in 2001, based on the American Champ Car series.

Harlin took over directing the action mystery film Mindhunters when the original director Peter Howitt dropped out, but the release was delayed by studio conflicts. Harlin went on to re-shoot a more traditional horror version of Exorcist: The Beginning (2004), after the studio was unhappy with the version cut by director Paul Schrader, which was more of a psychological drama. Mindhunters was released in the US in 2005.

Harlin directed the WWE Studios action movie 12 Rounds, starring John Cena. It was released in March 2009. In 2009, Harlin directed an independent war film in Georgia. The film, 5 Days of War, was a story about the 2008 war between Georgia and Russia in the region of South Ossetia. The film included real-life figures, including Georgian President Mikheil Saakashvili, played by Andy García.

2010s and move to China 
Harlin next directed the 2013 film Devil's Pass, set in Russia's Ural Mountains and loosely based on the Dyatlov Pass incident in 1959, when nine experienced hikers were found dead. Harlin then directed The Legend of Hercules, which opened in theatres on 10 January 2014. One of two Hercules movies released in 2014 – the other being Hercules, starring Dwayne Johnson – it was critically panned and was a box-office bomb.

Harlin directed the 2016 action comedy film Skiptrace, which starred Jackie Chan alongside Johnny Knoxville and Fan Bingbing. He then directed the 2018 film Legend of the Ancient Sword for Alibaba Pictures, based on a Chinese role-playing video game. The film was a box-office bomb, grossing only $1.25 million against a budget of $11 million. More recently, his film The Misfits received U.S. and international deals.

In 2021, he was selected as jury member at 11th Beijing International Film Festival for Tiantan Awards.

Unproduced and upcoming films 
In 1999, Harlin began developing the action-comedy Nosebleed at New Line Cinema, starring Jackie Chan as a window washer who foils a terrorist attack to destroy the World Trade Center. The film was delayed after changing studios to MGM in May 2001. After the September 11 attacks the plot was drastically rewritten ultimately before being completely shelved. Chan later told Oriental Daily News that the film was scheduled to begin filming at the North Tower less than two hours before it was hit by American Airlines Flight 11, and that he only escaped the attack because he made a last-minute decision to travel to Toronto to begin filming The Tuxedo instead. However, Chan's claim has been criticized as improbable since the production was delayed after the change in studios and since he was contracted for the production of The Tuxedo in Toronto months before the attacks.

Harlin's next project after Driven was to be a movie adaptation of the Ray Bradbury short story A Sound of Thunder, but Harlin left the project after a disagreement with Bradbury. Although the director was changed, Harlin was credited as a producer when the finished film was released in 2005.

In 2006, Harlin collaborated with Markus Selin to direct a biopic of the Finnish President and Marshal of Finland Carl Gustaf Emil Mannerheim, but budget constraints put the project on hold. Instead, Harlin made another foray into low-budget horror with The Covenant, which was another moderate commercial success. In 2007 the Mannerheim film project resumed temporarily and Harlin returned to Finland. The screenplay was written by Heikki Vihinen and Marko Leino, and was scheduled to be the largest film production in Finnish history. Production began in 2008 with Mikko Nousiainen starring as Mannerheim, and the film was to premiere in Helsinki on January 15, 2010. However, 30% of the funding was cut by one of the financiers due to the Great Recession, and the delay meant that the time window for shooting the winter scenes during the spring of 2009 passed. Pre-production finally commenced in 2010, and the project was assigned to Dome Karukoski in August 2011.

In 2007, it was announced that Harlin would direct an adaptation of the comic-book series Brodie's Law.

In 2011 it was reported that he was planning a sequel to The Long Kiss Goodnight.

On 16 June 2017 it was announced Harlin will direct Hanging Coffins for Shanghai Film Group and Shanghai New Wave Films. On 18 June 2017, it was announced Harlin will direct Operation Somalia. The film's story, based on true events, revolves around a rescue operation against Somali pirates mounted by Chinese Special Operations Forces.
On 8 May 2018, it was announced Harlin will direct Solara, a Chinese sci-fi epic revolving around an international team that must work together to save Earth from a global catastrophe. On 18 June 2018 it was announced Harlin will direct Operation Wild.

On January 19, 2021, it was announced that Harlin will direct the new Inspector Palmu film, based on a character created by Finnish writer Mika Waltari.

Personal life
Harlin was married to actress Geena Davis from 1993 to 1998. Harlin was unfaithful to Davis and she filed for divorce shortly after her personal secretary, Tiffany Bowne, gave birth to Harlin's first child, Luukas "Luke" Harlin, in August 1997. Since September 2021, Harlin has been married to fitness athlete and school teacher Johanna Harlin née Kokkila. They have a baby girl who was born in Miami, Florida, in July 2022.

Harlin lived in the United States from the mid-1980s until 2014, when he moved to China. After Harlin finished the shooting of the Finnish film Reunion 3: Singles Cruise in 2020, he moved to Sofia, Bulgaria.

Filmography

Short films

Films

Television

Awards and nominations

References

External links

1959 births
Living people
Finnish film directors
American film directors
English-language film directors
Finnish emigrants to the United States
Mountaineering film directors
Action film directors
Horror film directors
People from Riihimäki
20th-century Finnish male artists
21st-century Finnish male artists
Finnish expatriates in China
Finnish expatriates in Bulgaria